The Ministry of National Defence (abbreviated ΥΠΕΘΑ), is the civilian cabinet organisation responsible for managing the Hellenic Armed Forces, the leader of which is, according to the Constitution (Article 45), the President of the Republic but their administration is exercised only by the Prime Minister and the Government of Greece. It is located at 227-231 Messogion Avenue, in the Papagos camp (Pentagon) in Athens, between Papagos and Holargos.

Today is hierarchically ranked 3rd in the rankings of ministries, according to a decision of the Prime Minister (Government Gazette B / 1594 / 25-6-2013). The highest position in the history of the Ministry was the second, behind the ministry of the presidency of the government, on the last government of Andreas Papandreou (1993-1996).

It is considered to be a ministry of particular prestige and is one of the most desirable to the members of each government, because it oversees the Armed Forces, manages huge sums of money, and is usually away from the woes and the wear and tear of everyday life.

Since 9 July 2019, the Minister for National Defence is Nikos Panagiotopoulos.

History 
It was founded in 1950 from the unification of three Ministries:  under the influence of American advisors. However, a single Ministry of National Defense was established and operated in the three-year period of 1941-44 by the puppet governments (the legitimate exiled Greek government of the Middle East had retained the separate Ministries of Military Affairs, Naval Affairs and Aviation for the free Greek Armed Forces there).

Organisation

Civilian leadership
  Minister of Defence Υπουργός Εθνικής Άμυνας (Υ.ΕΘ.Α)
  Alternate Minister of Defence Αναπληρωτής Υπουργός Εθνικής Άμυνας (ΑΝ.Υ.ΕΘ.Α)
 Assistant Minister of Defence Υφυπουργός ή Υφυπουργοί Εθνικής Άμυνας (ΥΦ.ΕΘ.Α)

Advisory bodies
 Defence Council  Συμβούλιο Άμυνας (ΣΑΜ)
 Council of the Chiefs of the General Staff Συμβούλιο Αρχηγών Γενικών Επιτελείων (ΣΑΓΕ)
 Chief of the National Defence General Staff Αρχηγός Γενικού Επιτελείου Εθνικής Άμυνας (Α/ΓΕΕΘΑ)
 Supreme Councils of the Branches of the Armed Forces Ανώτατα Συμβούλια των Κλάδων των Εvόπλων Δυνάμεων (ΑΣΣ–ΑΝΣ–ΑΑΣ)
 Chiefs of the General Staff of the three Branches of the Armed Forces Αρχηγοί των Γενικών Επιτελείων των τριών Κλάδων (Α/ΓΕΣ–Α/ΓΕΝ–Α/ΓΕΑ)

Directorates of the MoND
The ministry is structured into three General Directorates:
 General Directorate for Financial Planning and Support Γενική Διεύθυνση Οικονομικού Σχεδιασμού και Υποστήριξης (ΓΔΟΣΥ)
 General Directorate for Defense Equipment and Investments Γενική Διεύθυνση Αμυντικών Εξοπλισμών και Επενδύσεων (ΓΔΑΕΕ)
 General Directorate for National Defense Policy and International Relations Γενική Διεύθυνση Πολιτικής Εθνικής Άμυνας και Διεθνών Σχέσεων (ΓΔΠΕΑΔΣ)

There are also the Departments of:
 Department of Briefing Διεύθυνση Ενημέρωσης
 Relief Fund for Disabled and War Victims Ταμείο Αρωγής Αναπήρων και Θυμάτων Πολέμου
 Single Administrative Sector Ενιαίος Διοικητικός Τομέας

Responsibilities 
Also, the ministry oversees the four General Staff of the Armed Forces:
 National Defence General Staff
 General Staff of the Army 
 General Staff of the Navy 
 General Staff of the Air Force

References

External links
  
 

Greece
National Defence
Military units and formations established in 1950
Greece, National Defence
Military of Greece
1950 establishments in Greece
Greece